Sohan Bridge railway station is  located in  Pakistan.

See also
 List of railway stations in Pakistan
 Pakistan Railways

References

External links

Railway stations in Mianwali District
Railway stations on Kotri–Attock Railway Line (ML 2)